Kasia Boddy is a Professor of American Literature at the University of Cambridge and a fellow of Fitzwilliam College. She was born in Aberdeen in 1966 and grew up in Glasgow, where she attended Hyndland Secondary School. She did an MA in English and Philosophy at Edinburgh and a PhD on American short fiction at Cambridge. She has also taught at the universities of York, Dundee and University College London.

Books 
Boddy is the author of:
Blooming Flowers: A Seasonal History of Plants and People, Yale University Press, 2020
Geranium. Reaktion Books, 2012.
The American Short Story Since 1950, Edinburgh University Press, 2010
Boxing: A Cultural History, Reaktion Books, 2008.

Her edited volumes include:
The New Penguin Book of American Short Stories, from Washington Irving to Lydia Davis, Penguin, 2011
Let's Call the Whole Thing Off: Love Quarrels from Anton Chekhov to ZZ Packer, with Ali Smith and Sarah Wood, Penguin, 2009
Brilliant Careers: The Virago Book of Twentieth-century Fiction, with Ali Smith and Sarah Wood, Virago Press, 2000

References 

Alumni of the University of Edinburgh
Living people
Alumni of the University of Cambridge
Year of birth missing (living people)
People from Aberdeen
21st-century Scottish writers
21st-century Scottish women writers